Doris Bay is a small bay immediately southeast of Saint Andrews Bay, along the north coast of South Georgia. The name dates back to about 1929 and is now well established.

References 

Bays of South Georgia